Adrian Lam (born 25 August 1970) is a Papua New Guinean professional rugby league coach who is the head coach of the Super League Club Leigh Leopards (was Leigh Centurions), and a former rugby league footballer.

He played for the Sydney Roosters in the National Rugby League and the Wigan Warriors in the Super League. He represented , Queensland State of Origin team and the Rest of the World team.

He was the head coach of Papua New Guinea between 2007 and 2012. He was assistant coach for Austraila in the 2022 RL World Cup.

Background
Lam was born 25 August 1970 in Rabaul, Papua New Guinea. His mother was from Liverpool and migrated to Australia as a child. She met Lam's father, a Chinese-Papua New Guinean, in Rabaul. The family moved to Brisbane in the Australian state of Queensland when Lam was seven.

Playing career
Lam had a fertile career with 14 State of Origin football matches for Queensland, including a man-of-the-match performance in the third game of the 1995 series. He made his Test début for Papua New Guinea in 1994 and went on to win 11 caps, scoring 3 tries and kicking 1 field goal. In 1996, he captained the 'Papua New Guinea National Rugby League Team' against Australia. In 1997, he captained the 'Rest of the World' team against Australia. He captained the Kumuls to the quarter finals in the 2000 Rugby League World Cup. He played at halfback for the Sydney Roosters in their 2000 NRL Grand Final defeat by the Brisbane Broncos.

He played a total of 146 club games for the Sydney Roosters, scoring 42 tries and kicking 6 field goals, as well as 119 first team games for Wigan Warriors, scoring 44 tries, kicking 1 goal and 10 field goals, including a try in their 2001 Super League Grand Final defeat by the Bradford Bulls.

Lam is one of only a few players to have played State of Origin for Queensland and for a country other than Australia. He is also the only player to be captain of a Queensland side and captain of a national team other than Australia.  The reason he was allowed to do this was that due to the Super League war, Queensland were in need of a half-back due to the fact regular half-back Allan Langer had signed with Super League.

Coaching career

Lam became coach of Papua New Guinea Kumuls national rugby league team in 2007, and was in charge for their 2008 Rugby League World Cup campaign. He quit as Kumuls' coach in 2009 after a dispute with the Papua New Guinea Rugby Football League.  In June 2007 he was appointed inaugural coach of the new QRL Wizard Queensland Cup Northern Pride team based in Cairns. However, three months later he was offered the position of assistant coach at the 
NRL Sydney Roosters under their new coach Brad Fittler. Lam was released and he left Cairns for Sydney before the Pride's first game.
In 2009 he moved to the St. George Illawarra Dragons as assistant coach under Wayne Bennett.
Lam became the coach of the St George-Illawarra Dragons Under 20s team in 2010 and 2011. He returned as coach of Papua New Guinea in 2012.

Lam returned to Wigan Warriors in 2019 as interim Head Coach and later in 2019 made his spell as Wigan coach full time as he signed for another year after Shaun Edwards opted not to join Wigan for 2020.  In 2020, Lam coached Wigan to the League Leaders Shield and guided them to the 2020 Super League Grand Final against St Helens where Wigan lost 8-4 after a try scored by the Saints following the full-time siren.  Lam was seen openly crying during the post match interviews.
In round 20 of the 2021 Super League season, Wigan were defeated at the DW Stadium by St Helens 2-26 under Lam's coaching. It was the first time in the clubs history, since moving to the DW Stadium in 1999, that they had failed to score a single try.
The following week, in Round 21, Wigan were beaten at home by Leeds 0-14, and this was the first time in Super League era that Wigan had been held scoreless at home.
On 31 August 2021 after a number of poor results, Lam announced that he would be leaving Wigan at the end of the 2021 season, after three seasons in charge.
Lam's final game in charge of Wigan came in the first week of the 2021 Playoffs Series against Leeds where Wigan lost 8-0.
On 17 November 2021, Lam was announced as head coach of Betfred Championship side Leigh Centurions, replacing interim head coach Kurt Haggerty.
On 3 October 2022, Lam coached Leigh in their Million Pound Game victory over Batley which saw the club promoted back to the Super League.  Lam achieved the double in his first full season as Leigh coach as the club also won the RFL 1895 Cup.

Personal life
His son Lachlan Lam is a professional rugby player, who represents Papua New Guinea and plays for Leigh Leopards. 

In 2010 a court ordered former State of Origin teammate Dale Shearer to repay approximately $1.5m to Lam for an outstanding loan, which dated back to 2005.

References

External links

Wigan profile
Player Details at stateoforigin.com.au
 Adrian Lam Wigan Career Page on the Wigan RL Fansite.
Wigan Warriors profile
Adrian Lam profile (Archived 2009-10-24)
Lam to take Wigan coaching role
Meet Wigan star Adrian Lam
http://news.bbc.co.uk/olmedia/970000/images/_973699_lam150.jpg

http://www.smh.com.au/articles/2004/04/24/1082719678288.html?from=storyrhs

1970 births
Living people
Australian rugby league coaches
Australian rugby league players
Northern Pride RLFC coaches
Leigh Leopards coaches
Papua New Guinea national rugby league team captains
Papua New Guinea national rugby league team coaches
Papua New Guinea national rugby league team players
Papua New Guinean emigrants to Australia
Papua New Guinean people of English descent
Papua New Guinean people of Chinese descent
Papua New Guinean rugby league coaches
Papua New Guinean rugby league players
People from Matalai
People from Namatanai
People from New Ireland Province
Queensland Rugby League State of Origin captains
Queensland Rugby League State of Origin players
Rugby league halfbacks
Sydney Roosters players
Wigan Warriors coaches
Wigan Warriors players